Lieutenant Colonel Vivian Statham,  ( Bullwinkel; 18 December 1915 – 3 July 2000) was an Australian Army nurse during the Second World War. She was the sole surviving nurse of the Bangka Island Massacre, when the Japanese killed 21 of her fellow nurses on Radji Beach, Bangka Island, in the Dutch East Indies (now Indonesia) on 16 February 1942.

Early life
Vivian Bullwinkel was born on 18 December 1915 in Kapunda, South Australia, to George Albert and Eva Bullwinkel (née Shegog). She had a brother, John. She trained as a nurse and midwife at Broken Hill, New South Wales, and began her nursing career in Hamilton, Victoria, before moving to the Jessie McPherson Hospital in Melbourne.

Second World War
In 1941, wanting to enlist for service in the Second World War, Bullwinkel volunteered as a nurse with the Royal Australian Air Force but was rejected for having flat feet. She was, however, able to join the Australian Army Nursing Service; assigned to the 2/13th Australian General Hospital (2/13th AGH), in September 1941 she sailed for Singapore. After a few weeks with the 2/10th AGH, Bullwinkel rejoined the 13th AGH in Johor Bahru.

Japanese troops invaded Malaya in December 1941 and began to advance southwards, winning a series of victories. By late January 1942 they were advancing through Johore and the 13th AGH was to evacuate to Singapore. A short-lived defence of the island ended in defeat, and, on 12 February, Bullwinkel and 65 other nurses boarded the SS Vyner Brooke to escape.

Two days later, the ship was sunk by Japanese aircraft. Bullwinkel, 21 other nurses and a large group of men, women, and children made it ashore at Radji Beach on Banka Island. Others on board either went down with the ship or were swept away and never seen again. The group were joined the next day by others making a total of about 100 including about twenty English soldiers from another ship sunk earlier. They elected to surrender to the Japanese. An officer from the Vyner Brooke walked to Muntok, a town on the north-west of the island, to contact the Japanese. While he was away Matron Irene Drummond, the most senior of the Australian nurses, suggested that civilian women and children should start off walking towards Muntok.

In an action that later became known as the Banka Island Massacre, Japanese soldiers came and killed the men, then motioned the nurses to wade into the sea. They then machine-gunned the nurses from behind. Bullwinkel was struck by a bullet which passed completely through her body, missing her internal organs, and feigned death until the Japanese soldiers left. She hid with British Army Private Cecil George Kingsley of the Royal Army Ordnance Corps for 12 days, tending to his severe wounds, only then realizing the extent of her own wound, before being captured. They were taken into captivity, but Kingsley died soon after from his injuries, which included a gunshot wound in his abdomen.

Recent evidence collected by historian Lynette Silver, broadcaster Tess Lawrence and biographer Barbara Angell, indicates that Bullwinkel and "most of" the nurses were sexually assaulted before they were murdered. However, Bullwinkel was "gagged" by the Australian government from speaking about the rapes at the Tokyo War Crimes Tribunal in 1946.

Bullwinkel was reunited with survivors of the Vyner Brooke. She told them of the massacre, but none spoke of it again until after the war lest it put Bullwinkel, as witness to the massacre, in danger. Bullwinkel spent three and half years in captivity, together with Betty Jeffrey, Wilma Oram and Margaret Dryburgh; Dryburgh, the eldest, died in captivity around the age of 55. Another surviving nurse was Pat Darling, who died in 2007.

Later life

Bulkwinkel retired from the army in 1947 and became Director of Nursing at the Fairfield Infectious Diseases Hospital. Also in 1947 she gave evidence of the massacre at a war crimes trial in Tokyo. She devoted herself to the nursing profession and to honouring those killed on Bangka Island, raising funds for a nurses' memorial and serving on numerous committees, including a period as a member of the Council of the Australian War Memorial, and later president of the Australian College of Nursing.

In 1975 Operation Babylift, the name given to the mass airlift of Vietnamese orphans to Australia and US, for its second delivery chose Fairfield Infectious Diseases Hospital as the most suitable specialist facility to receive them. Matron Bullwinkel organised and led a nursing team that travelled to Sydney to board the Qantas 707 for the flight to Vietnam on 17 April 1975.

Bullwinkel married Colonel Francis West Statham in September 1977, changing her name to Vivian Statham. She returned to Bangka Island in 1992 to unveil a shrine to the nurses who had not survived the war. She died of a heart attack on 3 July 2000, aged 84, in Perth, Western Australia.

Honours

In 2001 Bullwinkel was inducted posthumously to the Victorian Honour Roll of Women. She became the first woman to have an Australian War Memorial statue dedicated to her in 2022.

Legacy
The Vivian Bullwinkel Wing at Hollywood Private Hospital, Perth (the former Repatriation General Hospital, Hollywood) was renamed in her honour.

The Royal Australian Air Force Association runs the Vivian Bullwinkel Lodge aged care facility in the northern suburbs of Perth.

Monash University (Melbourne) and Eastern Health (Melbourne) have named the chair in palliative care nursing after her.

Northern Melbourne Institute of TAFE redeveloped the old nurses quarters on its Fairfield campus in 2010 for residential student accommodation. A common room is named after Vivian Bullwinkel, who was the Director of Nursing for many years at the Fairfield Hospital.

Citations

General references

Further reading
 Biodata
 Banka Massacre
 Jeffrey, Betty, White Coolies, Eden Paperbacks, Sydney, 1954
 Fifty Australians – Vivian Bullwinkel Australian War Memorial (Retrieved 9 March 2008)
 Roll of Honour Singapore Memorial

External links 
 

1915 births
2000 deaths
Associate Members of the Royal Red Cross
Australian Army personnel of World War II
Australian Members of the Order of the British Empire
Australian military nurses
Australian prisoners of war
Australian women nurses
Female wartime nurses
Florence Nightingale Medal recipients
Officers of the Order of Australia
People from Kapunda
Sole survivors
Shooting survivors
Women in the Australian military
Women in World War II
World War II nurses
World War II prisoners of war held by Japan